Arlarovo (Arlar) is a rural locality (a village) in Sayranovsky Selsoviet, Ishimbaysky District, Bashkortostan, Russia. The population was 210 as of 2010. There are 3 streets.

Geography 
Arlarovo is located 35 km east of Ishimbay (the district's administrative centre) by road. Sayranovo is the nearest rural locality.

References 

Rural localities in Ishimbaysky District